The jugular blenny (Alloblennius jugularis) is a combtooth blenny (family Blenniidae) found in the western Indian Ocean. Klunzinger originally placed this species in the genus Blennius. It is a tropical, marine and freshwater blenny which is known from the Gulf of Aqaba and the Red Sea, in the western Indian Ocean. Male jugular blennies can reach a maximum standard length of 5 centimetres (1.97 inches). The blennies are oviparous.

References

External links
 Alloblennius jugularis at ITIS
 Alloblennius jugularis at WoRMS

Jugular
Fish described in 1871